Kolar is a surname. Notable people with the surname include:

 Barbara Kolar (born 1970), Croatian actress, television and radio presenter
 Charlie Kolar (born 1999), American football player
 Drago Kolar (1932–2000), Slovenian academic
 Eddie Kolar (1909–1988), American professional basketball player (brother of Otto)
 Evzen Kolar (1950–2017), Czech film producer
 Jasna Kolar-Merdan (born 1956), Yugoslav and later Austrian handball player
 Katarina Kolar (born 1989), Croatian footballer
 Marko Kolar (born 1995), Croatian footballer
 Markus Kolar (born 1984), Austrian handball player
 Mary Kolar (born 1958), American military officer and politician
 Nastja Kolar (born 1994), Slovenian tennis player
 Otto Kolar (1911–1995), American professional basketball player (brother of Eddie)
 Rob Kolar, American musician
 Robert Kolar (born 1966), Serbian politician
 Slavko Kolar (1891–1963), Croatian writer
 Victor Kolar (1888–1957), American composer and conductor
 Zdenko Kolar (born 1956), Serbian bass guitarist

See also
 Kolář
 Kolár
 

Croatian surnames
Serbian surnames
Slovene-language surnames